Terence Donald Bamford  (1942 – 9 February 2020) was a social worker and writer on social work topics.

He had a degree in law from University College, Oxford, and a Diploma in Social Administration from the London School of Economics.

He worked as a probation officer for eight years before becoming Assistant General Secretary of the British Association of Social Workers. He then worked in Harrow and served for two years as Chair of the Association. He was Director of Social Services in Northern Ireland from 1985 to 1990. For ten years he was Executive Director of Housing and Social Services in the Royal Borough of Kensington and Chelsea. He was appointed an OBE in 2000. He was  chair of Kensington and Chelsea Primary Care Trust. In 2008 he was awarded the Medal and Diploma in Memory of Andrew Mouravieff-Apostol by the International Federation of Social Workers.

He died on 9 February 2020 at the age of 77.

Publications

References

1942 births
2020 deaths
Alumni of University College, Oxford
British social workers
Officers of the Order of the British Empire